Web Components are a set of features that provide a standard component model for the Web allowing for encapsulation and interoperability of individual HTML elements.

Primary technologies used to create them include:

 Custom Elements: APIs to define new HTML elements
 Shadow DOM: encapsulated DOM and styling, with composition
 HTML Templates: HTML fragments that are not rendered, but stored until instantiated via JavaScript

Features

Custom Elements
There are two parts to Custom Elements: autonomous custom elements and customized built-in elements. Autonomous custom elements are HTML elements that are entirely separated from native HTML elements; they are essentially built from the bottom up using the Custom Elements API. Customized built-in elements are elements that are built upon native HTML elements to reuse their functionality.

Shadow DOM 
Shadow DOM is a functionality that allows the web browser to render DOM elements without putting them into the main document DOM tree. This creates a barrier between what the developer and the browser can reach; the developer cannot access the Shadow DOM in the same way they would with nested elements, while the browser can render and modify that code the same way it would with nested elements. The impact of CSS scoped within the Shadow DOM of a particular element is that HTML elements can be encapsulated without the risk of CSS styles leaking and affecting elements that they were not supposed to affect. Although these elements are encapsulated with regard to HTML and CSS, they can still fire events that can be picked up by other elements in the document.

The scoped subtree in an element is called a shadow tree. The element the shadow tree is attached to is called a shadow host.

Shadow DOM must always be connected to an existing element, either through attaching it as a literal element or through scripting. In JavaScript, Shadow DOMs are attached to an element using Element.attachShadow().

HTML Template 
HTML template is a way to insert chunks of HTML that are stamped at will. The syntax of HTML templates looks like this:

<html>
    <template>
        <h1><slot name="title"></slot></h1>
        <p><slot name="description"></slot></p>
    </template>
</html>

Scripts will not run, and resources that are inside a template will not be fetched until the template is stamped out.

Browser support 

Web Components are supported by current versions of all major browsers.

Backward compatibility with older browsers is implemented using JavaScript-based polyfills.

Libraries 
There are many libraries that are built on Web Components with the aim of increasing the level of abstraction when creating custom elements. Some of these libraries are X-Tag, Slim.js, Polymer, Bosonic, Riot.js, Salesforce Lightning Web Components, DataFormsJS and Telepathy

From the above list, Bosonic, Polymer, Telepathy and DataFormsJS, all provide ready-made components that are free to use. These components can be used interchangeably as they are all built on open web technologies. While Bosonic, Polymer & DataFormsJS have far more pre-built components. Telepathy is "closest to the metal" in that its sole focus is on helping the developer to build easily maintained webcomponents rapidly.

Community 
There are numerous community efforts for the Web Components ecosystem. WebComponents.org provides an interface to search for any existing Web Components, Custom Elements Everywhere validates whether popular front-end frameworks are compatible and ready to use Web Components standard, with a set of pending bugs and available workarounds. Moreover, Vaadin Tutorials has a dedicated section that shows how those workarounds are used efficiently with example demo apps and similarly related topics.

History 
In 2011, Web Components were introduced for the first time by Alex Russell at Fronteers Conference.

In 2013, Polymer, a library based on Web Components was released by Google.

In 2018, Angular 6 introduced Angular Elements that lets you package your Angular components as custom web elements, which are part of the web components set of web platform APIs.

In 2018, Firefox 63 enabled Web Components support by default and updated the developer tools to support them.

References

External links 

Web Components Specifications WICG
 WICG specifications
Web Components at MDN Web Docs
Browser Support for Custom Elements at Can I Use?
Custom Elements Everywhere - Framework Support for Custom Elements
Open Web Components
What are Web Components?
twoBirds

Web standards
Web programming